Qutui Khatun was a Mongol princess and wife of Il-Khan Hulagu, founder of Ilkhanate, with whom she bored a child Tekuder who briefly served as Il-Khan from 1282 until 1284. She had an important role in state affairs during her son's reign. Part of Garabaghlar Mausoleum complex may have been built for her memory.

Biography 

Qutui Khatun was the daughter Chigu of the Khongirad tribe and Tümelün bekhi (daughter of Genghis Khan). She was a Nestorian Christian. Hulagu Khan married her after the death of Güyük Khatun. Qutui Khatun arrived in Iran around 1268 as a member of the second wave of Hulagu's relatives who remained in Mongolia after the Mongol invasion of Iran. She was on the way to meet her husband who died during her journey in 1265. She was informed about his passing while Badakhshan in present-day Tajikistan by his son and successor Abaqa Khan. Upon arrival, they were greeted by Abaqa Khan, Hulagu's son who succeeded him. Since she outlived her husband, according to the Mongol custom, she was married to Abaqa Khan.

After Abaqa's death in 1285, two political factions clashed over succession, with each fact being led by one of Hulagu's wives supporting their son's claim to the throne. One faction, that supported Möngke Temür was led by Öljei Khatun and the other, that supported Tekuder, was headed by Qutui Khatun. Other members of the royal family supported Tekuder. The decisive moment in the conflict was Megnu-Timur's death, which secured Tekuder's claim, and who was eventually enthroned on 6 May 1282.

Tekuder was a Muslim, and upon being enthroned, he took the name Ahmed. He proclaimed himself the protector of Islam, thus eroding the legitimacy of Sultan Al-Mansur Qalawun of Mamluk Sultanate, with whom he unsuccessfully tried to make peace during the Mongol invasions of the Levant. However, Tekuder didn't spend much time in state affairs. The fiscal responsibilities of the state were taken care of by his mother Qutui Khatun and Asiq, the amir of her orda. She also received foreign diplomats and participated in creating foreign strategy towards Mamluk Sultanate. Tekuder even waited to make a decision in state affairs only after consulting with his mother who had a final say.

However, Tekuder became unpopular among the Mongol elites, the so-called "Old-Mongol" party of Nestorian Christians and Buddhists, who now favoured his nephew Arghun, Abaqa's son. They protested to Kublai Khan who threatened he would intervene. Tekuder blamed the Nestorian Church of the East for the appeals to Kublai Kahn and threw its Patriarch Yahballaha III into prison. His life was saved by Qutui Khatun. Arghun gained crucial support from Qonqurtai who originally supported Tekuder, and from the party that supported late Mengu-Timur and his mother Öljei Khatun. Tekuder thus replaced Qonqurtai with Alinaq and ordered the arrest of both Qonqurtai and Arghun. Arghun armies were defeated at Aq-Khoja near Qazvin on 4 May 1284 and he surrendered. While Tekuder waited for his mother's decision on the matter, Arghun was held imprisoned by Alinaq. However, a palace revolution broke out after a conspiracy among the military, and Arghun was released on 4 July. Tekuder was deserted by his troops and killed on 10 August. Arghun was enthroned the next day.

Qutui Khatun started organising support against the usurper, however, Qara'unas attacked and plundered their orda under Arghun's command.

Notes

References

Books

Journals 

 

Women of the Mongol Empire
Nestorians
Mongol Empire Christians
13th-century Mongolian women